George Philip Chamberlain  (18 August 1905, in Enville, Staffordshire2 November 1995) was an Air Vice-Marshal in the Royal Air Force.

References

External links
Air of Authority - Air Vice-Marshal G P Chamberlain

1905 births
1995 deaths
People from Staffordshire (before 1974)
Place of death missing
Royal Air Force air marshals
Military personnel from Staffordshire
Royal Air Force personnel of World War II